Sangarius is a Phrygian river-god of Greek mythology.

Mythology 
He is described as the son of the Titans Oceanus and his sister-wife Tethys and as the husband of Metope, by whom he became the father of Hecuba. In some accounts, the mother was called the naiad Evagora. Alternatively, Sangarius had a daughter Eunoë who became the mother of Hecabe by King Dymas. He was also the father of Nana and therefore the grandfather of Attis. By Cybele, Sangarius became the father of Nicaea, mother of Telete by Dionysus. His other children were Sagaritis and Ocyrrhoe.

The Sangarius river in Phrygia (now Sakarya in Asian Turkey) itself is said to have derived its name from one Sangas, who had offended Rhea and was punished by her by being changed into water.

See also 
 Peneus
 Alpheus (deity)
 Agdistis

Notes

References 
 Apollodorus, The Library with an English Translation by Sir James George Frazer, F.B.A., F.R.S. in 2 Volumes, Cambridge, MA, Harvard University Press; London, William Heinemann Ltd. 1921. ISBN 0-674-99135-4. Online version at the Perseus Digital Library. Greek text available from the same website.
 Hesiod, Theogony from The Homeric Hymns and Homerica with an English Translation by Hugh G. Evelyn-White, Cambridge, MA.,Harvard University Press; London, William Heinemann Ltd. 1914. Online version at the Perseus Digital Library. Greek text available from the same website.
 Nonnus of Panopolis, Dionysiaca translated by William Henry Denham Rouse (1863-1950), from the Loeb Classical Library, Cambridge, MA, Harvard University Press, 1940.  Online version at the Topos Text Project.
 Nonnus of Panopolis, Dionysiaca. 3 Vols. W.H.D. Rouse. Cambridge, MA., Harvard University Press; London, William Heinemann, Ltd. 1940–1942. Greek text available at the Perseus Digital Library.
 Publius Ovidius Naso, Fasti translated by James G. Frazer. Online version at the Topos Text Project.
 Publius Ovidius Naso, Fasti. Sir James George Frazer. London; Cambridge, MA. William Heinemann Ltd.; Harvard University Press. 1933. Latin text available at the Perseus Digital Library.
 Quintus Smyrnaeus, The Fall of Troy translated by Way. A. S. Loeb Classical Library Volume 19. London: William Heinemann, 1913. Online version at theio.com
 Quintus Smyrnaeus, The Fall of Troy. Arthur S. Way. London: William Heinemann; New York: G.P. Putnam's Sons. 1913. Greek text available at the Perseus Digital Library.

External links 
 SANGARIUS on the theoi project

Potamoi
Phrygian characters in Greek mythology
Cybele
Sea and river gods
Greek gods
Rhea (mythology)
Greek mythology of Anatolia
Metamorphoses into bodies of water in Greek mythology